Opilidia chlorocephala, the lime-headed tiger beetle, is a species of flashy tiger beetle in the family Cicindelidae. It is found in Central America and North America.

Subspecies
These two subspecies belong to the species Opilidia chlorocephala:
 Opilidia chlorocephala chlorocephala (Chevrolat, 1834)
 Opilidia chlorocephala smythi (E. Harris, 1913) (Smyth's lime-headed tiger beetle)

References

Further reading

 

Cicindelidae
Articles created by Qbugbot
Beetles described in 1834